This is a list of schools operated by Detroit Public Schools

Schools

Pre-Kindergarten through 12 schools

 Academy of the Americas (will eventually go to grade 12)
 Detroit International Academy for Young Women

Kindergarten and 7–12 schools
 Boykin Continuing Education Center (optional)

7–12 schools
(Alternative)
 Douglass Academy for Young Men

High schools

Zoned high schools 
 Central High School
 Frank Cody High School
 Denby Technical & Preparatory High School
 East English Village Preparatory Academy
 Ford High School
 Dr. Martin Luther King, Jr. High School (formerly Eastern High School)
 Mumford High School
 Northwestern High School (Detroit Collegiate Preparatory High School at Northwestern)
 Pershing High School
 Southeastern High School
 Western International High School

Optional high schools
 Barsamian Preparatory Center (Alternative)
 Cass Technical High School
 Communication & Media Arts High School  
 Crocket Midtown High School of Science & Medicine 
 Crosman Alternative High School
 Davis Aerospace High School
 Detroit City High School
 Detroit High School for Technology (Pershing Tech)
 Detroit School of Arts
 Millennium School
 Osborn High School
 Renaissance High School 
 Trombly Alternative High School
 West Side Academy Alternative Education

PreK-8 schools

Zoned PreK-8 schools

 Ann Arbor Trail Magnet School
 Bates Academy
 Mary McLeod Bethune Elementary/Middle School
 Blackwell Institute
 Bow Elementary/Middle School
 Mary McLeod Bethune Elemenetary/Middle School
 Beulah Brewer Academy
 Ronald Brown Academy (formerly Stellwagen Elementary School)
 Ralph J. Bunche Preparatory Academy (formerly Smith Elementary School)
 Burns Elementary School
 Burton International School
 Butzel Elementary/Middle School
 Cartsens Elementary/Middle School
 Carver Elementary School
 Clark J.E. Preparatory Academy
 Davison Elementary School
 The school is located in two buildings, around 100 years old, in proximity to Highland Park and Hamtramck.
 Dixon Educational Learning Academy
 Earheart Elementary/Middle School
 Fisher Magnet Academy
 Fisher Magnet Lower Academy (PreK-4)
 Fisher Magnet Upper Academy (5-8)
 Fitzgerald Elementary School
 Garvey Academy
 Golightly Education Center (formerly Saleh Elementary School) 
 Gompers Elementary/Middle School
 Greenfield Union Elementary School
 Henderson Academy
 A.L. Holmes Academy of Blended Learning
 Hutchinson Elementary/Middle School (formerly Howe Elementary School)
 John R. King Academic and Parforming Arts Academy
 Law Elementary School
 Mackenzie Elementary/Middle School
 Thurgood Marshall Elementary School
 Mark Twain School for Scholars
 Marquette Elementary/Middle School
 Neinas Dual Language Learning Academy
 Noble Elementary School
 Nolan Elementary/Middle School
 Palmer Park Preparatory Academy (formerly Hampton Elementary School)
 Priest Elementary/Middle School
 Pulaski Elementary/Middle School
 Robeson Malcolm X Academy
 Sherrill Elementary School
 Charles L. Spain Elementary/Middle School 
 Stewart Elementary School (was MacCulloch Elementary)
 Westside Multicultural Academy

Alternative PreK-8 schools
 Academy of The Americas
 Brenda Scott Academy
 Edward 'Duke' Ellington Conversatory of Music & Art at Beckham Academy

K-8 schools

Zoned K-8 schools
 Ann Arbor Trail Magnet Middle School
 Burns Elementary/Middle School
 Dossin Elementary/Middle School
 Durfee Elementary/Middle School
 Earhart Elementary/Middle School
 Lessenger Elementary/Middle School
 Frank Murphy Elementary/Middle School
 Munger Elementary/Middle School
 Nichols Elementary School
 Nolan Elementary School
 Thirkell Elementary/Middle School 
 In 2013 the Mackinac Center's Elementary and Middle School Report Card ranked this school as the top elementary in the State of Michigan
 Trix Elementary School
 Vetal Elementary School

Alternative K-8 schools

 Edward (Duke) Ellington Conservatory of Music/Art
 Moses Field Center
 Foreign Language Immersion
 Hancock Preparatory Center
 Langston Hughes Academy
 MacDowell Preparatory Academy

5–8 schools
(Zoned)
 Farwell Middle School
 Erma Henderson Upper School
(Alternative)
 Clippert Multicultural Honors Academy (was McKinstry Elementary School)
 Ludington Magnet Middle School

6–8 schools
(Zoned)
 Barbour Magnet Middle School
 Cerveny Middle School
 Columbus Middle School
 McNair Middle School
 Robinson Middle School
 Brenda Scott Middle School
(Alternative)
 Hally Magnet Middle School
 Heilmann Park Middle School

PK-6 schools
(Zoned)
 No. 1 John R King
 Bagley Elementary School
 Ronald Brown Academy
 Cooke STEM Academy
 Dossin Elementary School
 MacDowell Preparatory Academy
 Thurgood Marshall Elementary School
 Pasteur Elementary School
 Schulze Academy for Technology and Arts
 Vernor Elementary School

K-6 schools
(Zoned)
 Cooke Elementary School
 Pasteur Elementary School

PreK-5 schools
(Zoned)
 Bennett Elementary School
 Carleton Elementary School
 Roberto Clemente Learning Academy
 Emerson Elementary School
 Gompers Elementary School
 Maybury Elementary School
 Wayne Elementary School
 Coleman A. Young Elementary School (formerly Stratford Elementary School)

K-5 Schools
(Zoned) 
 Chrysler Elementary School
 Gardner Elementary School
 Harms Elementary School
Duke Ellington @Beckingham

Former schools
See: List of closed public schools in Detroit

References

Detroit
Public Schools schools